Ouidad Elma is a French-Moroccan actress. She was born in Rif Mountains, Morocco, October 2, 1992. She grew up in Paris in the neighborhood of Menilmontant.

Early life 
Elma began acting classes when she was six years old. She joined the theatre company in Paris and began acting professionally at the age of sixteen. She played her first character for the movie "Sa raison d'être" directed by Renaud Bertrand. Then she played a lead role in the French film "Plan B" directed by Kamel Saleh. She then moved to Morocco and pursued her acting career by playing lead roles in various films. She played in "Love The Medina", "Zero" directed by Noureddine Lakhmari and in "The Rif Lover", L'Amante du Rif directed by Narjiss Nejjar.

Film career 
In 2014 Elma appeared in the TV miniseries The Red Tent and the film Madness. The following year, she appeared in the film Killing Jesus and the FX series Tyrant.

In 2016, she signed with the Medi 1 TV channel in the television series of Ghoul and the French film Tazzeka. Also that year, Elma appeared in the BBC series The Last Post which aired in October 2017.

Awards and nominations 
Elma has obtained nominations and awards for her films, notably at the Dubai international film festival, Festival International du Film Francophone de Namur and Marrakech International Film Festival in 2011 and 2012. In 2015, she won the Best Actress Award for "Madness" at the Agadir Film Festival.

Music video 
In 2015, Elma appeared in the music video for Skrillex's song "Fuck That."

Filmography

Film
 2021 : The Last Mercenary : Farah
 2018 : Amin directed by Philippe Faucon
 2018 : Demi-soeurs directed by Saphia Azzeddine and François Régis Jeanne 
 2016 : Tazzeka directed by Jean-Philippe Gaud : Salma
 2015 : La lisière (Short) directed by Simon Saulnier: Hawa
 2015 : Chaïbia  directed by Youssef Britel : Amal
 2014 : 7, rue de la Folie/ Madness directed by Jawad Rhalib : Sara
 2012: Zéro  directed by Noureddine Lakhmari : Nadia
 2011: L'amante du rif directed by Narjiss Nejjar : Radia
 2011: Love in the medina directed by Abdelhai Laraki : Zineb
 2010 : Plan B directed by Kamel Saleh : Lydia

Television
 2017 : The Last Post directed by Jonny Campbell and Miranda Bowen : Yusra
 2016 : Ghoul ( 30 episodes ) directed by Jean Luc Herbulot : Amal
 2015 : Tyrant 2.2 - Enter The Fates directed by Gwyneth Horder-Payton : Amina
 2015 : Killing Jesus directed by Christopher Menaul : Sarah
 2014 : The Red Tent directed by Roger Young : Abi
 2008 : Sa raison d'être directed by Renaud Bertrand : Kayna

References

Living people
21st-century French actresses
21st-century Moroccan actresses
French film actresses
French television actresses
Moroccan film actresses
Moroccan television actresses
Year of birth missing (living people)